The 2004–05 season was the 102nd in the history of the Southern League, which is an English football competition featuring semi-professional and amateur clubs from the East Midlands, West Midlands, East, South East and South West England. 

Also, it was the first season after the creation of the Conference North and South, one step above the Southern League. Therefore, it was the inaugural season for the league at the seventh and eighth tiers in the English league system.

Premier Division
After the creation of the Conference North and South placed above the Southern League, most of the previous season clubs were transferred to the newly created divisions.

Histon won the Premier Division and get a second promotion in a row along with play-off winners Hednesford Town. Hemel Hempstead, Dunstable, Stamford and Solihull Moors were relegated and returned to division One.

League formation
The Premier Division featured only six clubs from the previous season and 16 new clubs:

 Six clubs remained in the league:
 Bath City
 Chippenham Town
 Grantham Town
 Hednesford Town
 Merthyr Tydfil
 Tiverton Town
 Six clubs promoted from the Western Division:
 Cirencester Town
 Gloucester City
 Halesowen Town
 Rugby United
 Solihull Borough
 Team Bath

 Four clubs promoted from the Eastern Division:
 Banbury United
 Histon
 King's Lynn
 Stamford
 Three clubs transferred from Isthmian League Premier Division:
 Aylesbury United
 Bedford Town
 Hitchin Town
 Three clubs promoted from Isthmian League Division One North:
 Chesham United
 Dunstable Town
 Hemel Hempstead Town

League table

Play-offs

Stadia and locations

Eastern Division
After the creation of the Conference North and South one step above the Southern League, most of the Premier Division clubs were transferred to the newly created divisions. Consequently, most of the Eastern Division clubs took up the empty spots in higher divisions.

Fisher Athletic won the division and were promoted along with runners-up East Thurrock United and play-off winners Maldon Town, who get the second promotion in a row. Erith & Belvedere and Tilbury finished bottom of the league and were relegated.

League formation
In the first season as an eighth tier league, the Eastern Division featured five clubs from the previous season and 17 new clubs:

 14 clubs promoted from Isthmian League Division One North:
 Arlesey Town
 Aveley
 Barking & East Ham United
 Barton Rovers
 Berkhamsted Town
 Boreham Wood
 East Thurrock United
 Great Wakering Rovers
 Harlow Town
 Tilbury
 Uxbridge
 Waltham Forest
 Wingate & Finchley
 Wivenhoe Town

 Five clubs remained in the league:
 Chatham Town
 Dartford
 Erith & Belvedere
 Fisher Athletic
 Sittingbourne
 Plus:
 Beaconsfield SYCOB, promoted from the Spartan South Midlands League
 Leighton Town, promoted from the Isthmian League Division Two
 Maldon Town, promoted from the Eastern Counties League

League table

Play-offs

Stadia and locations

Western Division
After the creation of the Conference North and South one step above the Southern League, most of the Premier Division clubs were transferred to the newly created divisions. Consequently, most of the Western Division clubs took up the empty spots in higher divisions.

Mangotsfield United won the division and were promoted to the Premier Division along with runners-up Yate Town and play-off winners Evesham United. Oxford City and Egham Town finished bottom of the table and were relegated.

League formation
In the first season as an eighth tier league, the Western Division featured eleven clubs from the previous season and eleven new clubs:

 Three clubs transferred from the Eastern Division:
 Burnham
 Corby Town
 Rothwell Town
 Two clubs transferred from Isthmian League Division One North:
 Oxford City
 Thame United
 Four clubs transferred from Isthmian League Division One South:
 Ashford Town (Middlesex)
 Bracknell Town
 Egham Town
 Marlow
 Plus:
 Brackley Town, promoted from the Hellenic League
 Paulton Rovers, promoted from the Western League

League table

Play-offs

Stadia and locations

See also
Southern Football League
2004–05 Isthmian League
2004–05 Northern Premier League

External links
Football Club History Database

Southern Football League seasons
7